Eois willotti is a moth in the family Geometridae. It is found on Borneo. The habitat consists of lowland forests, including dipterocarp forests and heath forests.

The length of the forewings is 9–10 mm. The wings are yellow, strongly fasciated with red.

References

Moths described in 1997
Eois
Moths of Asia